Phaeogramma vittipennis is a species of tephritid or fruit flies in the genus Phaeogramma of the family Tephritidae.

Distribution
Hawaiian Islands.

References

Tephritinae
Insects described in 1901
Diptera of Asia